Nana Boateng may refer to:
 Nana Boateng (footballer, born 1994), Ghanaian midfielder for CFR Cluj
 Nana Boateng (footballer, born 2002), English forward for Millwall